The Junkers Ju 290 was a large German, four-engine long-range transport, heavy bomber and maritime patrol aircraft used by the Luftwaffe late in World War II that had been developed from an earlier airliner.

Design and development

The Junkers 290 was developed directly from the Ju 90 airliner, versions of which had been evaluated for military purposes, and was intended to replace the relatively slow Focke-Wulf Fw 200 Condor which by 1942 was proving increasingly vulnerable when confronted by Royal Air Force aircraft; the Fw 200's airframe lacked sufficient strength for the role in any case. The Ju 290 was also intended to meet the need for large transport aircraft. A bomber version, the A-8, was planned, but never built. Design was headed by Konrad Eicholtz.

The development programme resulted in the Ju 290 V1 prototype BD+TX, which first flew on 16 July 1942. It featured a lengthened fuselage, more powerful engines, and a Trapoklappe hydraulic rear loading ramp. Both the V1 and the first eight A-1 production aircraft were unarmed transports. The need for heavy transports saw the A-1s pressed into service as soon as they were completed. Several were lost in early 1943, including one taking part in the Stalingrad Airlift, and two flying supplies to German forces in Tunisia, and arming them became a priority.

The urgent need for Ju 290s in the long-range maritime reconnaissance role was now also high priority, and resulted in the Ju 290A-2. Three A-1 aircraft were converted to A-2 specification on the assembly line. Production was slow due to the modifications necessary and the installation of strong defensive armament. The A-2 was fitted with FuG 200 Hohentwiel low-UHF band search radar and a dorsal turret fitted with a 20 mm MG 151 cannon. It allowed the Ju 290 to track convoys while remaining out of range of anti-aircraft fire.

The A-3 version followed shortly after with additional navigational equipment and a heavier defensive armament. It was fitted with two hydraulically powered HDL 151 dorsal turrets armed with 20 mm MG 151/20 cannons, with a further 20 mm MG 151/20 and a 13 mm (.51 in) MG 131 machine gun fitted in a typically German Bola gondola (a fitment for almost all German WW II bomber aircraft) directly underneath the forward dorsal gun turret, and a 20 mm MG 151/20 fitted in the tail operated by a gunner in a prone position. Two 13 mm (.51 in) MG 131s were also fitted in waist positions (Fensterlafetten). The A-3, along with the A-2, also featured large fuselage auxiliary fuel tanks. Both retained the rear loading ramp so that they could be used as transports if required. The A-5 variant was fitted with increased armour protection, dual 13mm MG 131 in a rear-facing position in the gondola. and had two dorsal turrets, operating either a 20mm MG 151/20 or a MG 151/15. The last A-5, W. Nr. 0180, carried two 20mm MG 151 cannon in lieu of the smaller MG 131. The A-5 had the capability of launching Fritz X and other guided munitions.

The improved A-7 version appeared in spring 1944; 13 were completed, and 10 served with the long-range reconnaissance group, Fernaufklärungsgruppe (FAGr) 5. Some A-7s and some A-4s were fitted with a detachable nose turret armed with a 20 mm MG 151/20 for added defense against frontal attack. No bombs were carried, as it was intended that the A-5 and A-7 would be fitted with the FuG 203 Kehl radio guidance system to launch MCLOS-guided Fritz X and Hs 293 anti-ship missiles.

Production lines were set up at the Letov aircraft factory in Prague for combat versions of the aircraft, commencing with the Ju 290 A-2, which carried the aforementioned Hohentwiel maritime search radar for its patrol role. Minor changes in armament distinguished the A-3 and A-4, leading to the definitive A-5 variant. The A-6 was a 50-passenger transport aircraft.

The B-1 was a high-altitude heavy bomber that was the last variant to be built; a B-2 version was also under development.

Operational history

A special long-range reconnaissance group, FAGr 5 (Fernaufklärungsgruppe 5), had been formed on 1 July 1943 and during the late summer of 1943 three of the new Ju 290 A-2s were delivered to its 1 Staffel, which became operational at Mont-de-Marsan near Bordeaux on 15 October of that year. They flew their first operational missions in November 1943, shadowing Allied convoys in cooperation with U-boats, often remaining airborne for up to 18 hours.

Five Ju 290 A-3 aircraft with more powerful BMW 801D engines in unitized mounts followed, as did five Ju 290 A-4 aircraft with improved dorsal turrets mounting 20 mm MG 151/20s. The Ju 290s were well suited to their patrol role and began replacing the Fw 200 Condors. An A-4, Works no. 0165, was experimentally equipped with attachments for FX 1400 PGM, and either the Henschel Hs 293 or Hs 294 anti-ship missiles, and fitted with the FuG 203e Kehl MCLOS radio control transmitter system for controlling any of them after release; it was surrendered to the US after the war and flown across the Atlantic to the USA.

In November 1943, a second Staffel was activated and, with a range of over 6,100 km (3,790 mi) the Ju 290s ranged far out over the Atlantic, relaying sightings of Allied convoys to U-boats. 11 Ju 290 A-5s with increased armour, heavier armament and self-sealing fuel tanks were delivered to FAGr 5 early in 1944, as were around 12 of the Ju 290 A-7 version; the A-7 could carry three Hs 293 glide bombs or Fritz X armoured, anti-warship precision-guided munitions when fitted with the FuG 203 Kehl radio guidance system for them, and featured a redesigned nose section which combined a 20 mm cannon installation with the FuG 200 radar aerial array.

Towards the end of 1943, Admiral Dönitz demanded that the entire output of Ju 290s be made available for U-boat warfare. However, only 20 were assigned for this purpose. Even though both Hitler and Dönitz demanded an increase, the Luftwaffe General Staff declared it was unable to assign any more for naval reconnaissance purposes. The General Staff argued that there could be no increase in output so long as the Luftwaffe was not conceded "precedence in overall armaments".

In the spring of 1944, after Albert Speer had taken over the direction of air armaments, the Luftwaffe High Command boldly announced that production of the Ju 290 was to be suspended despite it being urgently needed for maritime reconnaissance; suspending production meant that resources could instead be diverted to building fighters. At that point in time, Speer's position was weak and Hermann Göring was trying to find allies to help him strip Speer of his power, and the Luftwaffe was not prepared to offer the Navy more than "goodwill".

On 26 May 1944, shortly after daybreak, a Sea Hurricane piloted by Sub Lieutenant Burgham from the escort carrier HMS Nairana shot down Ju 290 9V+FK of FAGr 5 over the Bay of Biscay. The afternoon of the same day, Sub Lieutenants Mearns and Wallis attacked two more Ju 290s. Mearns shot down 9V+GK piloted by Kurt Nonneberg, which ditched in the sea. The other Ju 290 disappeared on fire into cloud and was assumed to have crashed.

As the Battle of the Atlantic swung irrevocably in favour of the Allies with the loss by the Germans of French bases in August 1944, FAGr 5 withdrew eastwards and the remaining Ju 290s were reassigned to transport duties, including service with KG 200, where they were used to drop agents behind enemy lines and other special missions.

Ju 290 A-5, works number 0178, D-AITR, Bayern of Luft Hansa flew to Barcelona on 5 April 1945, piloted by Captain Sluzalek. The aircraft suffered damage to its landing gear on landing and was repaired with parts brought from Germany by a Lufthansa Fw 200. It remained in Spain because the Spanish Government ordered that regular Luft Hansa flights on route K22 be terminated from 21 April and was turned over to the Spanish authorities.

Flights to Japan

Following the invasion of the Soviet Union in June 1941, plans were made to connect Germany and Japan by air using Luftwaffe aircraft modified for very long range flights. Commercial flights to the Far East by Lufthansa were no longer possible, and it had become too dangerous for ships or U-boats to make the trip by sea. Field Marshal Erhard Milch authorised a study into the feasibility of such direct flights. Various routes were considered, including departing from German-occupied Russia and Bulgaria. Nautsi, near Lake Inari in the north of Finland, was finally selected as the optimum starting point for a great circle route along the Arctic Ocean then across eastern Siberia, to refuel in Manchuria before completing the flight to Japan.

In 1943, the Ju 290 was selected for the flights and tests began in February 1944 of a Ju 290 A-5 (works number 0170, Stammkennzeichen factory code of KR+LA) loaded with 41 tonnes (45 tons) of fuel and cargo. Three Ju 290 A-9s (works numbers 0182, 0183 and 0185) were modified for long-range work at the Junkers factory in March 1943. The plan was eventually put on indefinite hold after the Japanese failed to agree on a route, as they did not want to provoke the Soviet Union by an overflight of Siberia, and the three aircraft were eventually transferred to KG 200 without any attempt at a long-range flight to Japan.

The idea for a flight to Japan was revived again in December 1944 to transport Luftwaffe General Ulrich Kessler to Japan as a replacement for the German air attaché in Tokyo. Ju 290 A-3, no. 0163, was flown to Travemünde for the necessary modifications, but the work was delayed and it was decided to send Kessler aboard the submarine U-234 instead. The aircraft was destroyed on 3 May 1945 as British troops arrived. Some sources claim that the trip to Japan took place, departing from Odessa and Mielec and landing in Manchuria.

KG 200

The Luftwaffe Special Operations squadron, KG 200 used the Ju 290 amongst its various aircraft types. Their  best-known Ju 290 mission was flown on the night of 27 November 1944. KG 200 pilots Braun and Pohl flew a Ju 290 from Vienna to a position just south of Mosul, Iraq, where they successfully air-dropped five Iraqi parachutists. Staging through the island of Rhodes, which was still under German occupation, they evacuated some thirty casualties from there to Vienna.

Variants

Hitler's personal transport

On 26 November 1943, Ju 290 A-5, no. 0170, along with many other new aircraft and prototypes, was shown to Adolf Hitler at Insterburg, East Prussia. Hitler was impressed by its potential and told Göring that he wanted a Ju 290 for his personal use.  A Ju 290 was not however assigned to the Fliegerstaffel des Fuehrers (FdF) until late 1944, when an A-7 was supplied, works number 0192, which had formerly been assigned to FAGr 5. Modifications were completed by February 1945 at the FdF's base at Pocking, Bavaria, a Stammkennzeichen alphabetic designation code of KR+LW being applied. Hitler's pilot, Hans Baur, tested the aircraft, but Hitler never flew in it.

The aircraft was fitted with a special passenger compartment in the front of the aircraft for Hitler, which was protected by 12 mm (.5 in) armour plate and 50 mm (2 in) bulletproof glass. A special escape hatch was fitted in the floor and a parachute was built into Hitler's seat; in an emergency it was intended that he would put on the parachute, pull a lever to open the hatch, and roll out through the opening. This arrangement was tested using life-size mannequins.

Hans Baur flew the aircraft to Munich-Riem airport on 24 March 1945, landing just as an air-raid alert was sounded. He went home after parking it in a hangar but on returning to the airport, he discovered that both hangar and aircraft had been destroyed by American bombers.

Ju 290Z Zwilling

Junkers project documents from 1942 to 1944 indicate that a Zwilling (English: twin) variant was proposed.  It was to be composed of two Ju 290 fuselages and powered by eight BMW 9-801 engines; two mounted on each outboard wing and four on the inboard wing.  It was to carry a single Messerschmitt Me 328 parasite fighter on top of the right fuselage.  The Ju 290Z was canceled in favor of the Ju 390.

Amerika Bomber precursor

The long range of the Ju 290 made it a good candidate for further development concerning the Amerika Bomber project, competing with the airworthy prototype of the Messerschmitt Me 264, the never-built Heinkel He 277 and Focke-Wulf Ta 400 designs, and as a result, the six-engined Ju 390, based directly on the Ju 290 airframe with even longer range was built in prototype form, two airframes being completed and test-flown. The Ju 290 itself was under consideration to serve as a tanker to refuel the Messerschmitt entry in the Amerika Bomber design competition. In late 1942 Field Marshal Milch ordered that the possibility of increasing the fuel capacity of the Ju 290 to enable it to perform the Amerika Bomber mission itself. The draw backs were twofold, first the initial rate of climb would be very poor, and the fully loaded airplane could only operate out of two fields in France. A lightened Ju 290E subtype was proposed in March 1943, but remained on paper. The Ju 390 at its gross weight required a tow to take off. At first a He 111Z was tried but the Ju 390 was predicted might be unstable in such an instance so plans were changed to use two Ju 290s instead. During May 1942 engineers at Junkers had done calculations to investigate the possibility of refueling the Ju 390 in flight from a Ju 290, something that had been proposed earlier for the same sort of duty to support the initial high-altitude version of the rival Heinkel He 177A, the proposed A-2 subtype – with such capability, the range of the He 177A-2 would have been extendable to some 9,500 km (5,900 mi) of total flight distance. By March 1943 consideration of using a Ju 290 to refuel another was made and the result was to see up to four Ju 290s converted to be tankers or long range bombers. Tanker/receiver experiments continued in early 1944 when two Ju 290 A-2s were tested under operational conditions from Mont de Marsan in France. As Germany lost access to the ocean — and the cancellation of both the He 277 on Hitler's 55th birthday, followed by the Me 264's cancellation on September 23, 1944; the America Bomber role soon evaporated, and by October 1944, all production was stopped. Both the Ju 290A-8 and Ju 390A-1 were each intended to use two of the under-development, Borsig-designed Hecklafette HL 131V quadmount tail turrets (each armed with four Rheinmetall-Borsig MG 131 machine guns apiece), with one turret in its originally intended role for rearwards defence and, one in the nose, adapted for forward defence.

Germany's Last Ju 290s

Despite the end of reconnaissance operations from France and the Amerika bomber program, starting in September 1944 three more Ju 290s were constructed for "special purposes" by Junkers. Their works numbers are unknown. What those "special purposes" were, or if they ever came to be, is unknown.

Postwar

A number of Ju 290s survived the war, the Allies evaluating at least three examples, none of which was known to have survived intact into the 21st century.

 Ju 290 A-4 no. 0165, which had been equipped with attachments for Fritz X, Hs 293, and Hs 294 PGM ordnance, and fitted with FuG 203e Kehl radio guidance gear for controlling such PGM ordnance, was surrendered to the U.S. Renamed Alles Kaputt, and numbered FE 3400, it was flown to the US by Colonel Harold E. Watson from Orly, Paris to Wright Field on 28 July 1945, via the Azores. The captured aircraft, with its Nazi insignia repainted, was a frequent performer at air shows at Freeman Field and Wright Field. When the aircraft was scrapped at Wright Field in 1946, a plastic explosive device of German manufacture was discovered in the wing near to a fuel tank.
An A-5 (Wk. no. 0178), Bayern of Luft Hansa, which had been interned at Barcelona, was acquired by the Spanish and was eventually used by the Spanish Air Force from 29 April 1950 to 27 July 1956 as a government transport of personnel for the Superior School of Flight in Salamanca. Following an accident, it was scrapped due to a lack of spare parts in May 1957.
A final Ju 290 was built by the Letov Kbely aircraft company in Czechoslovakia in 1946, using parts intended for the Ju 290 B-1 high-altitude prototype. It was completed as a transport with capacity for either 40 or 48 passengers (sources vary), and designated Letov L-290 "Orel" (Eagle). It was offered as an airliner but was not adopted because it lacked the appropriate internal equipment, and the BMW engines were not available in sufficient numbers.

Operators

Ceské aerolinie operated one aircraft postwar as Letov L.290 Orel.

Luftwaffe
Deutsche Luft Hansa

Spanish Air Force operated 1 ex-Luftwaffe aircraft postwar.

Specifications (Ju 290 A-5)

See also

References

Notes

Bibliography

 Azaola, Luis Ignacio de. "The Last of the Grossen Dessauer". Air Enthusiast. No. 9, February–May 1979. pp. 76–77. 
 
 Deist, Wilhelm, Maier Schreiber, et al. Germany and the Second World War. Oxford, UK: Oxford University Press, 1990. .
 Kössler, Karl and Günther Ott. Die großen Dessauer: Junkers Ju 89, Ju 90, Ju 290, Ju 390 – Die Geschichte einer Flugzeugfamilie. Berlin: Aviatic-Verlag, 1993. .
 Green, William. Warplanes of the Third Reich. London: Macdonald and Jane's Publishers Ltd., 1970. .
 Griehj, Manfred Luftwaffe Over Amerika. New York: Barnes & Noble, 2006. .
 Hitchcock, Thomas H. Junkers 290 (Monogram Close-Up 3). Boylston, Massachusetts: Monogram Aviation Publications, 1975. .
  Kay, Antony L. and Paul Couper. Junkers Aircraft and Engines, 1913–1945. London: Putnam Aeronautical Books, 2004. .
 Nowarra, Heinz J. Junkers Ju 290, Ju 390 etc.. Atglen, Pennsylvania: Schiffer Military History, 1997. .
 Polmar, Norman and Thomas B. Allen. World War II: America at War, 1941–1945. New York: Random House, 1991. .
 Samuel, Wolfgang W. E. American Raiders: The Race to Capture the Luftwaffe's Secrets. Jackson, Mississippi: University Press of Mississippi, 2004. .
 Smith, J. Richard and Anthony Kay. German Aircraft of the Second World War. London: Putnam and Company, 1972. .
 Stahl, P. KG 200: The True Story. London: Janes's, Book Club edition, 1981. .
 Sweeting, C. G. Hitler's Personal Pilot: The Life and Times of Hans Baur. Washington, D.C.: Brassey's, 2001. .
 Sweeting, C. G. and Walter J. Boyne. Hitler's Squadron: The Fuehrer's Personal Aircraft and Transport Unit, 1933–45. Washington, D.C.: Brassey's, 2001. .
 Thomas, Andrew and John Weal. Hurricane Aces 1941–45. Oxford, Uk:  Osprey Publishing, 2003. .
 Turner, P. St. John and Heinz J. Nowarra. Junkers, an Aircraft Album. New York: ARCO Publishing Company, Inc., 1971. .

Ju 290
World War II heavy bombers of Germany
World War II patrol aircraft of Germany
World War II transport aircraft of Germany
1940s German bomber aircraft
1940s German patrol aircraft
Aircraft first flown in 1942
Twin-tail aircraft
Four-engined piston aircraft
Four-engined tractor aircraft